Edge of Twilight may refer to:

 Edge of Twilight (series), a multi-platform steampunk video game series.
 Edge of Twilight (video game), the eponymous second title in the series
 "Edge of Twilight", a song by Gentle Giant from the album Acquiring the Taste